St Luke's Football Club was a football club based in Canning Town, England.

History
St Luke's were formed in the 1880s. In 1895, St Luke's entered the South Essex League, finishing second. In 1896–97, St Luke's entered the FA Cup, losing 3–1 against Ilford at home in the first qualifying round. In January 1897, St Luke's resigned from the South Essex League, dissolving in the process.

Ground
St Luke's played on Beckton Road in Canning Town. The ground hosted the second replay of the 1896 West Ham Charity Cup final, where 4,000 spectators witnessed Thames Ironworks win their first trophy after beating Barking Woodville 1–0.

Records
Best FA Cup performance: First qualifying round, 1896–97

References

Canning Town
Defunct football clubs in England
Defunct football clubs in London
Association football clubs established in the 1880s
Association football clubs disestablished in 1897
South Essex League
Sport in the London Borough of Newham
1880s establishments in England
1897 disestablishments in England